Frank Giuseppe Carbone (born 26 March 1970) is an Australian politician currently serving as the Mayor of the City of Fairfield, one of the largest local government areas in New South Wales by population.

He previously served as a councillor for the City of Fairfield between 2008 and 2012 representing the Fairfield Ward before replacing Nick Lalich as mayor in 2012. Carbone was popularly re-elected at the 2012, 2016, and 2021 NSW local government elections.

Early life 
Carbone was born at Fairfield Hospital on 26 March 1970. He attended Harrington Street Public School in Cabramatta West, and later Bonnyrigg High School where he completed his Higher School Certificate.

With his brother Pasquale, Carbone owned and operated a successful local jewellery business in Canley Heights prior to entering politics.

Political career 
In 2008, Carbone was preselected by the Labor Party to stand on their ticket in the Fairfield Ward for the NSW local government election held on 13 September. During his first term on Fairfield City Council, Carbone attracted media attention when it was revealed part of a public park in Canley Vale would be rezoned and turned into a cul-de-sac to service a number of residential and commercial properties which he and his brother owned shares in.

Owing to changes in NSW Government legislation preventing state parliamentarians serving on local councils, former mayor Nick Lalich announced his intention to step down from Fairfield City Council to focus his efforts on being MP for Cabramatta. This allowed for Carbone to become mayor of Fairfield City on 21 March 2012.

Six months later at the 2012 NSW local government election, Carbone was popularly elected mayor with 71.3% of the vote after preferences. During his first term as mayor, Carbone oversaw major projects including the Fairfield Showground redevelopment, Fairfield Adventure Park, Aquatopia Water Park, and the Fairfield Youth and Community Centre.

Leading into the 2016 NSW local government election Carbone was under pressure from colleagues in the Labor Party with state parliamentarians Nick Lalich (Cabramatta MP), Hugh McDermott (Prospect MP), and Guy Zangari (Fairfield MP) writing to ALP head office asking to disendorse Carbone claiming his property interests conflicted with his civic duties. He was cleared by a candidate review panel however the Labor Party still decided to dump Carbone as their mayoral candidate for Fairfield City, they instead opted for Lalich's partner Del Bennett leading to Carbone standing for mayor without ALP endorsement. Carbone's decision to stand as an independent saw him expelled from the Labor Party for running against their endorsed candidate.

During the 2016 mayoral election, Carbone found an unlikely ally in former Liberal Party member Dai Le who had also been suspended from her party over standing against endorsed candidates. The combined Carbone-Le independent ticket also ran candidates in all Fairfield City Council wards and appealed to disenfranchised voters.

Carbone was ultimately successful in retaining mayoralty of the City of Fairfield and becoming the first popularly elected independent mayor in Fairfield's history, claiming victory over Labor's Del Bennett by just 135 votes. A recount was ordered by the returning officer which increased Carbone's margin of victory to just 233 votes.

Throughout Carbone's second term as mayor he continued with the transformation of Fairfield City signing up to the Western Sydney City Deal between the Australian and NSW Governments, allowing projects such as the Fairfield Showground redevelopment, Deerbrush Park all-abilities playground, and Aquatopia Water Park upgrade to be fast tracked.

Throughout the COVID-19 pandemic, Carbone was a vocal figure standing up for his community when the NSW Government imposed harsh restrictions including curfews, mandatory 'surveillance testing', permits for authorised workers, and limiting exercise (1 hour per day and no more than 5 km from your home). These were applied to supposed "LGAs of Concern" which initially included Canterbury-Bankstown, Fairfield, and Liverpool (and was later expanded to also include Bayside, Blacktown, Burwood, Campbelltown, Cumberland, Georges River, Parramatta, and Strathfield).  During this period, Carbone and other mayors regularly locked horns with NSW Premier Gladys Berejiklian over her handling of restrictions for his community with Sydney's affluent east and north under a separate set of rules prompting questions of a double standard designed to segregate Sydney.

At the 2021 NSW local government election, Carbone was re-elected mayor with 73.5% of the vote. He also teamed up again with Dai Le fielding candidates in all Fairfield City Council wards and between them their team won 10 of the available 12 seats on Fairfield City Council.

In 2022, Carbone flirted with the idea of running for the federal electorate of Fowler against Labor frontbencher Kristina Keneally. Ultimately he did not stand for election and instead supported his Deputy Mayor Dai Le who went on to win the seat with a swing of 16% becoming the first refugee and Vietnamese Australian to be elected to the Australian House of Representatives.

Personal life 
Carbone is married to Gina and has two children.

References 

1970 births
Living people
Mayors of Fairfield, New South Wales
Politicians from Sydney
New South Wales local councillors
Australian people of Italian descent